Cyprus is set to participate in the Eurovision Song Contest 2023 in Liverpool, United Kingdom, having internally selected Andrew Lambrou to represent the country with the song "Break a Broken Heart".

Background 

Its best placing was at the  where Eleni Foureira placed second with "". Cyprus' least successful result was in the  when it placed last with the song "" by Elpida, receiving only four points in total. After returning to the contest in  following their absence in  due to the 2012–13 Cypriot financial crisis and the broadcaster's budget restrictions, Cyprus has qualified for the final of all the contests until , when "" performed by Andromache failed to advance from the semi-finals.

The Cypriot national broadcaster, CyBC, broadcasts the contest within Cyprus and organises the selection process for the nation's entry. Cyprus has used various methods to select its entry in the past, such as internal selections and televised national finals to choose the performer, song or both to compete at Eurovision. In 2015, the broadcaster organised the national final Eurovision Song Project, which featured 54 songs competing in a nine-week-long process resulting in the selection of the Cypriot entry through the combination of public televoting and the votes from an expert jury. Since 2016, however, the broadcaster has opted to select the entry internally without input from the public. On 28 May 2022, it was reported by OGAE Greece that the label Panik Records had signed an agreement with CyBC in order to select the Cypriot artist for 2023 through a Greek-Cypriot talent show based on the British reality television music competition All Together Now. However, such plans were pushed back to 2024, with the broadcaster reverting to an internal selection.

Before Eurovision

Internal selection 
CyBC continued to internally select the Cypriot entry for the Eurovision Song Contest 2023, in conjunction with Panik Records. On 17 October 2022, CyBC announced that they had selected Australian-Cypriot singer Andrew Lambrou to represent Cyprus in Liverpool. Lambrou had previously attempted to represent Australia at the Eurovision Song Contest in 2022, placing seventh in the national final Eurovision – Australia Decides 2022 with the song "Electrify". His entry, "Break a Broken Heart", was released on 2 March 2023.

At Eurovision 
According to Eurovision rules, all nations with the exceptions of the host country and the "Big Five" (France, Germany, Italy, Spain and the United Kingdom) are required to qualify from one of two semi-finals in order to compete for the final; the top ten countries from each semi-final progress to the final. The European Broadcasting Union (EBU) split up the competing countries into six different pots based on voting patterns from previous contests, with countries with favourable voting histories put into the same pot. On 31 January 2023, an allocation draw was held, which placed each country into one of the two semi-finals, and determined which half of the show they would perform in. Cyprus has been placed into the second semi-final, to be held on 11 May 2023, and has been scheduled to perform in the first half of the show.

References 

2023
Countries in the Eurovision Song Contest 2023
Eurovision